The Renault Trafic (pronounced as "traffic") is a light commercial van produced by the French automaker Renault since 1980. It is also marketed as the Fiat Talento, the Nissan NV300, the Nissan Primastar, the Mitsubishi Express and, until the model year of 2018, as the Opel/Vauxhall Vivaro (previously, Opel/Vauxhall Arena).

Previous versions of the Renault Trafic have been sold under Inokom, Chevrolet and Tata badges.

The third generation Vauxhall Vivaro was produced in GM Manufacturing Luton plant starting in 2013. However, following the takeover of Opel/Vauxhall by Groupe PSA, the Trafic-based Vivaro went out of production in 2018, and was replaced by the next generation Vivaro based on the Citroen Jumpy EMP2 Platform for the 2019 model year.



First generation (1980)

The original Renault Trafic was sold from 1980 to 2001 and was somewhat revised and updated during its lifetime.

Originally, the van had some variations in the front end shape depending on which engine was fitted, with the original 1397 cc motor fitting behind a flat grille, and the 2.1 litre diesel engine and larger 1647 cc petrol engines requiring an extended plastic grille and deeper bumper.

The 1721 cc OHC engine replaced the 1647 cc OHV unit in the mid 1980s, which fitted under the shorter grille, but required a small lump in the bonnet. The diesel and 2.2 petrol carried on with the extended grille.

In the end of 1984, a four-wheel drive version was introduced. This was a part time system coupled with the diesel engine and a five speed manual transmission. This model operated as a front wheel drive until the rear wheels were engaged with a dog clutch, a system similar to the one used by Renault on the R18 4x4.

In May 1989, the Trafic underwent a major front end facelift, with a rounder shape and a plastic bumper, and the new longer body shape covering all varieties of engine. In 1995, the Mk1 Trafic got its final facelift, with a new grille, new tail lights, large double rear view mirrors, and a new interior with a modern dashboard and multi adjustable seats.

This version was also sold as the Opel Arena and as the Vauxhall Arena from 1997.

Winnebago
The chassis and cab of the 1980s models were used as the base vehicle by Winnebago Industries to build the Winnebago 'LeSharo' from 1983, and Itasca Phasar.

For the chassis and cab version to meet safety and emission requirements in the United States, this version was sold with Renault's J7T: , and 2.1 litre diesel and turbo diesel engines, coded as J8S and shared with the 1985 to 1987 AMC/Jeep Cherokee/Commanche.

Note: Jeep versions used the Garrett T2 turbo and Winnebago's, the larger T3. C.A.R.B. granted a series of yearly waivers to Winnebago for the non compliance of fitting On Board Diagnostics (OBD I), and remained in effect throughout the model run from 1983 to 1992.

Campervan Variants
The Mk1 Trafic became popular for professional conversion into budget family motorhomes due to the flexibility of the design and the generous internal space for what was a relatively small van. Popular converters were Auto Sleepers and Holdsworth (now defunct). Other motorhome builders using the Trafic Mk1 as a base include Hymer, Elddis, Eriba, and Autostar.

Opel Arena

From 1997 to 2001, the Renault Trafic was marketed as the Opel Arena in Germany and as the Vauxhall Arena in the United Kingdom. Nick Reilly, Vauxhall's chairman and managing director commented that the Arena was the first time the company had a total commercial range ever since the days of the old Bedford CF that ended production in 1986.

Tata Winger

In June 2007, Tata Motors announced the introduction of the Winger, a panel van and minibus based on the 1995 to 2001 version of the Renault Trafic, but fitted with Tata's own two litre diesel engines, with or without turbo.

Inokom Permas
The Inokom Permas was launched in Malaysia in 1998. Production of the van was at Kulim District.

South America
For South America, the vehicle was made in the Renault Argentina facility at Santa Isabel, Córdoba. In Brazil, it was badged as Chevrolet Trafic and later as the Renault Trafic or Chevrolet SpaceVan. A pickup version was sold as the Renault Trafic Rodeo. Production ended in 2002.

Gallery

Second generation (X83; 2001)

The second Trafic resulted from a joint venture between German Opel, Japanese Nissan, and French Renault. It is also sold as an Opel/Vauxhall Vivaro and Nissan Primastar.

Designed by Renault's corporate design department based within the company's Technocentre outside Paris, the Trafic was developed by the engineering team of Renault's light commercial vehicle unit at Villiers-Saint-Frédéric. Manufactured by GM Manufacturing Luton at its plant in Luton — beside Primastar and the Vivaro — the Trafic was the first Renault vehicle to be built in the United Kingdom in more than thirty years.

In an agreement between Renault and Nissan, versions of the van are also manufactured at Nissan's plant in Barcelona, Spain. In particular, high roof versions for Vauxhall, Renault, and Nissan are made in Barcelona because the Luton assembly plant has a low roof which cannot accommodate the extra height of the high roof.

The van exists in several versions, from a three seater with all the rear space available for loads, to a nine seater. Its name is based on the French word for "trade" or "traffic" (depending on the context). The van was designed by Renault in Paris, and both Renault and Opel versions are manufactured by Opel at their plant in Luton. In 2012, production of the Vauxhall Vivaro totalled 36,982 and 16,483 for the Renault Trafic.

A mild facelift in October 2006 had the orange indicators swapped for clear ones, which were more integrated into the headlamp housings. On the Opel model, the indicators moved from the front bumpers, up into the headlamp housings, thus looking more similar to the Renault. Production ended in June 2015.

Gallery

Nissan Primastar
The Nissan Primastar was also launched in 2001, and is available in panel van, combi, bus, and chassis cab configurations. Two wheelbases and two roof heights are available, as well as three diesel engines and a petrol. In the end of 2014, the last Primastar rolled off the production line. It was replaced by the NV300 in September 2016.

Gallery

Opel Vivaro A
The Opel Vivaro from the German automaker Opel was launched in September 2001. While the Vivaro is sold as an Opel in most European markets, in the United Kingdom it was sold as a Vauxhall. The Vivaro is primarily manufactured at GM Manufacturing Luton (previously IBC) in Luton, England and by Nissan at their Zona Franca (Barcelona) facility in Spain.

The Vivaro is available in panel van, minibus, combined bus/van, and platform crew cab configurations. Two different wheelbase styles, and two roof height options are also available, as well as three diesel engine power options and a petrol engine.

The Vivaro e Concept debuted September 2010 at the IAA Commercial Vehicle Show in Hanover, Germany.

Gallery

Engines

Third generation (X82; 2014)

Renault released a new generation Trafic in September 2014. It was again rebadged and sold as the Opel Vivaro in Europe and Vauxhall Vivaro in the UK. Styling was updated for the 2019 model year and again for model year 2021.

Two lower power variants (90 PS and 120 PS) use a variable geometry turbocharger, while the highest output (140 PS) variant employs a twin turbocharger arrangement; other features include variable output water and oil pumps and a maintenance free timing chain.

Rebadged variants
Opel/Vauxhall Vivaro variants for the United Kingdom and mainland Europe were manufactured at GM Manufacturing Luton, except for the high roof variants, which were manufactured at Sandouville. The new Vivaro dropped the previous larger capacity diesel engines, in favour of a 1.6 Energy dCi (Renault)/CDTI (Opel) engine. From 2016, Vauxhall Vivaro models gained a Made In Britain badge at the rear. The Opel/Vauxhall Vivaro went out of production in 2018, when Opel/Vauxhall was acquired by Groupe PSA; it was replaced by a new generation Vivaro which was a rebadged Citroën Jumpy for the model year of 2019.

Renault–Nissan Alliance partner Nissan sold a rebadged Trafic II (X83) as the Primastar. The Primastar was renamed to the NV300 for 2016 and moved to the Trafic III (X82). The light commercial vehicle variant of the NV300 reverted to using the Primastar nameplate in 2021.

In July 2016, Fiat introduced a rebadged Trafic, called Talento to replace its Scudo, which had been a rebadged Citroën Jumpy. In October 2019, the vans were given a facelift which introduced a new 2.0-litre EcoJet diesel engine which is 11 percent more fuel efficient than the older 1.6 litre and variable-geometry turbocharger for smoother engine performance at low speeds. Small exterior changes include revised front bumper and black plastic wing mirrors instead of painted ones. Interior received a updated steering wheel, textured crash pads on the dashboard, new choice of interior trims and 7-inch touchscreen infotainment system with Apple CarPlay and Android Auto supported. In October 2020, Renault announced it would stop supplying Talentos to Fiat, as Fiat Chrysler had declared plans to merge with Renault's rival Groupe PSA to form Stellantis. The Talento was replaced by a new Scudo/Ulysses, which was again a rebadged Jumpy.

In 2020, the Trafic was rebadged and introduced as the third-generation Mitsubishi Express for Australia, and as a replacement for the former L300 in the New Zealand market. It was discontinued two years later. The existing Renault Trafic has also been sold in these markets since 2014.

Models

Trafic Formula Edition

Launched in 2018, the Formula Edition was available on the Trafic alongside the Kangoo and Master, and featured a new paint and wheels, plus black and yellow trim.

Trafic X-Track
Launched in 2016, the Trafic X-Track is a front-wheel drive offroad version of the Trafic.

Trafic E-Tech

The 100% electric Trafic was officially presented at the 2022 IAA. The van can accept charging power of up to 7 kW (single-phase AC) or 22 kW (three-phase AC), and a fast-charging option (50 kW DC) is available. A passenger van variant may be based on the Hippie Caviar Hotel concept shown in 2021.

Gallery

Engines

Dimensions

Notes

References

External links

 Renault Trafic official website
 The original Renault Trafic as a camper van (includes a photo of the original Trafic, pre-facelift)
 Opel Vivaro official website

Trafic
Vans
Minibuses
Road vehicles manufactured in the United Kingdom
Vehicles introduced in 1980